Al-Hilal Saudi Football Club, simply known as Al-Hilal, is a professional multi-sports club based in Riyadh, Saudi Arabia. Their football team competes in the Saudi Professional League. They are the most decorated club in Asia winning 65 official trophies. They also hold the record for the most continental trophies in Asia, as well as a record 18 Professional League titles.

Founded on 16 October 1957, Al-Hilal are one of three teams to have participated in all seasons of the Saudi Professional League since its establishment in 1976.

Overall, Al-Hilal have won 65 official titles and national 100 when unofficial trophies are counted. In domestic competitions, they have won a record 18 Professional League titles, a record 13 Crown Prince Cup titles, a record seven Saudi Federation Cup titles, nine King Cup titles, a record three Super Cup titles, and also the Saudi Founder's Cup.

Internationally, Al-Hilal have won a record eight Asian Football Confederation trophies – the AFC Champions League in 1991, 2000, 2019 and 2021, the Asian Cup Winners Cup in 1997 and 2002, and the Asian Super Cup in 1997, 2000. In September 2009, Al-Hilal was awarded Best Asian Club of the 20th Century by the IFFHS.

History

Founding and early years (1957–1979) 
The idea of establishing the club began when the ranks of the Youth Club witnessed in 1377 AH a serious division among its leaders, which prompted Mr. Abdul Rahman bin Saeed to resign from the presidency of the Youth Club in that year, and many left with him, including a number of prominent players.

The opportunity was ripe for the establishment of a new club at the first-class level to serve Saudi sports, and this was already done when a new club was established  on 15 October 1957 in Riyadh. The club's name lasted for only one year before it was changed to its current name on 3 December 1958 by King Saud. He changed the name after he attended a tournament that was contested between the Olympic Club, Al Nassr, Al Riyadh and El Kawkab clubs. As soon as the club's establishment, Al-Hilal enjoyed not only grassroots support but also royal attention.

After spending their formative years building a squad, the club made their first mark by lifting the King's Cup trophy in 1961. Al-Hilal won the King's Cup again in 1964, with a penalty shootout victory over two-time Asian champions Al-Ittihad. The club also won the crown prince cup in 1963-64

The club were the inaugural winners when the Saudi Premier League came into existence in the 1976–77 season. Al-Hilal also won the league title in 1978–79.

With the success, a number of players and coaches from outside Saudi Arabia joined the club in the 1970s, including Brazilian legends Mario Zagallo and Roberto Rivelino.

Sustained success (1980–1990) 

After the establishment of the Saudi Premier League in the late 70's and with Al-Hilal winning the competition twice including the inaugural edition. The eighties brought about a new dawn of success to the riyadh giants, with group of talented homegrown players such as the charismatic figurehead defender Saleh Al-Nu'eimeh who captained both Al-Hilal and the Saudi National Football Team, together with the promotion of the extremely gifted player maker Yousuf Al-Thunayan and the young and prolific forward Sami Al-Jaber. The club went on to win four league titles as well as four kings cup titles in ten years, two of those being season double's. Al-Hilal were the runners-up in the Asian club Championship twice. They were second after the round-robin in the final round in 1986. They reached the final the following year in 1987, but Yomiuri FC were crowned the champion automatically as Al-Hilal were unable to field a team for the final due to nine of the starting players being chosen for the Saudi team's preparation camp that clashed with the date fixed for the first leg.

Continental dominance (1991–2002) 
The 90's marked a shift in the dominant teams challenging for the title, such as the emergence of a Al-Shabab as a new contender and force in the league. As well as the resurgence of bitter rivals Al-Nasser and Al-Ittihad made the league become contested and shared between the four, Al-Hilal achieved three titles during this period (1995–96, 1997–98, 2001–02). The club continued to churn out talent from its academy with players such as Nawaf Al-Temyat, Mohammed Al-Shalhoub, Abdallah Al-Jamaan, Ahmad Al-Dokhi as well as Zambian defender Elijah Litana. Al-Hilal's continental spoil's during this period defined the clubs identity, decadence and standing in the Asian continent for years to come. The first of which came in 1991 when the club won their first Asian title, the Asian Club Championship, beating Iranian club Esteghlal F.C. in penalties in the final. In 1997 the Asian Cup Winners Cup and Asian super cup were also obtained. The club won the Asian Club Championship again in 1999–2000, when they scored an equaliser in the 89th minute and won the match against Júbilo Iwata in the extra-time, with the final being one of the most exciting and competitive in the competition's history; A super cup was also achieved in the same year. Finally the last of the Asian titles to be secured in this era was the 2002 Cup Winners Cup.

League duopoly (2003–2011) 
At the turn of the century the historic rivalry between Al-Hilal and Al-Ittihad had reached levels never seen before in Saudi football. Historically, since their first meeting, Al-Hilal/Al-Ittihad matches have always been aggressive and passion filled spectacles that drew huge crowds due to both teams being from the two major Saudi cities of Riyadh and Jeddah. Each team represented different cities, backgrounds and values. Al-Hilal is based in Riyadh the capital of Saudi Arabia, in addition to having traditional Najdi values the club is most commonly supported by the upper and middle class and also enjoyed royal attention. While on the other hand, Al-Ittihad is based in the port city of Jeddah and is commonly supported by the lower and middle class as well as non-Saudi natives giving it the nickname "the people's club". Both teams dominated this era of Saudi football history. Al-Hilal won the title/s in ( 2001–02, 2004–05, 2007–08, 2009–10, 2010–11). Al-Ittihad's golden generation in this period of time equaled Al-Hilal's two AFC Champions League titles, as well as winning the league title/s in (2000–01, 2002–03, 2006–07, 2008–09). This resulted in both teams exchanging winner and runner-up positions almost every season in the league for eleven years with the exception of two seasons.

The pinnacle moment of the era was in the 2007–08 season when Al-Ittihad was leading the table the whole season with Al-Hilal always right behind in second, the final match day pitted both teams against each other in the Prince Abdullah Al-Faisal Stadium in Jeddah with Al-Ittihad needing a draw at the minimum to clinch the league title at home. Al-Ittihad were the clear favourites due to their much superior quality and home advantage. The match began with Al-Ittihad leading in possession and attacking opportunities but to no avail. In the 49th minute Ahmed Al-Fraidi crossed the ball from the edge of the box, to which Yasser Al-Qahtani skimmed with a header to the right bottom corner of the goal giving Al-Hilal a 1–0 lead four minutes after half time. Al-Ittihad franticly tried to equalise with an abundance of shots but Mohamed Al-deayea goalkeeping heroics the whole match denied them the goal they so desperately needed, and even more so after Al-Qahtani's goal. The referee finally blew the whistle and Al-Hilal were crowned the league champions in Jeddah, and under whose management of Cosmin Olăroiu was coupled with the Crown Prince Cup finishing the season with a double. The league is commonly known and remembered with the nickname (Arabic: شعره ياسر) which roughly translates to "Yasser's hair" due to the winning goal being scored with a header that skimmed the ball with Yasser's hair veering the ball towards the goal. What made the occasion even more special is that the same outcome happened the previous season but the teams were in the opposite situation.

Before the beginning of the 2009–10 season Eric Gerets was hired as the new Al-Hilal manager. Under his management Al-Hilal tactically adopted a very attacking style, combining an already talented local group of players with star foreign players such as the versatile South Korean right back Lee Young-pyo, the powerful and dominant defensive midfielder Mirel Rădoi, the speedy Swedish winger Christian Wilhelmsson and the technically gifted Brazilian attacking midfielder Thiago Neves. This blend of local and foreign talent guided by a tactically astute manager dominated the league and were crowned champions with three games to spare, a crown prince cup was also won in the same season. In the following 2010–11 season Al-Hilal continued to dominate domestically and continentally until their semi-final exit from the 2010 ACL, shortly following their exit Eric Gerets left to become the new head coach of the Morocco national football team. After Gerets's departure Gabriel Calderon took over as head coach of Al-Hilal and finished the updated 14 team league as undefeated champion with 19 wins and 7 draws, becoming the second team to achieve this feat after Al-Ettifaq. The season finished as a double due to the Crown Prince Cup being retained

Struggle at the continental stage (2012–2019) 
After their back-to-back league titles and generally consistent success in the domestic front, Al-Hilal always seemed to come up short in their continental pursuit since their last triumph in the 1999-2000 campaign. Adding to an already aging local core and departing key players, Al-Hilal was in a transition period to rebuild the team that was able to challenge domestically and in the Champions league. Al-Hilal reached the final of AFC Champions League in 2014, 14 years after their last appearance in the final. This time they faced Western Sydney Wanderers. The Australian club won 1–0 on aggregate with some very questionable refereeing decisions by Yuichi Nishimura (what the fans claim). During this period of time Al-Hilal was not able to win the league title for five seasons beginning from the 2011–12 to the 2015–16 season, finishing runner up in three of those seasons, and was only able to achieve five cup titles: Crown Prince cup (2011–12, 2012–13, 2015–16), King cup (2015) and a Super cup (2015) Against arch rivals Al-Nasser held at Loftus Road Stadium, in London

At the start of the 2016–17 season a string of bad results caused Gustavo Matosas to be sacked and replaced by Ramón Díaz. Diaz's reorganised the tactical shape and style of play in which the team was engaging with as well as the conditioning his players to quickly grasp his philosophy. Taking advantage of the fact that throughout the generations Al-Hilal's success largely came from academy players as well as key signings, which the squad already possessed but the group was not in sync or able to reach their true potential. Players such as goalkeeper Abdullah Al-Mayouf was brought back From Al-Ahli because of his distribution abilities, right and left backs Yasser Al-Shahrani and Mohammed Al-Breik excelled in chance creation and also in attacking output, Salman Al-Faraj and Abdullah Otayf connection in the midfield linked exceptionally for their vision, technical and passing abilities and intelligence in reading the game as well as rarely giving away possession. Salem Al-Dawsari was extremely talented but unpolished player when he was promoted to the first team in 2011, but has matured to become a key player. These player became the spine of the team and an integral part of Al-Hilal squad for years to come. The managerial replacement radically changed the team's performance by playing possession-based attacking football which the aforementioned players turned out to be very adept to. Al-Hilal finished the season as champions of the league and King cup with the former being achieved with record points in a season.

The following season continued in the same rhythm with Al-Hilal leading in the domestic league and reaching the 2017 AFC Champions league final. But they ultimately lost to the Japanese side Urawa Red Diamonds 1–2 in aggregate after Carlos Eduardo suffered an ACL tear in the first minutes of the first leg, and Omar Kharbin suffered an injury in the second leg. The team slumped mentally after the defeat and began a series of subpar performances which lead to their exit from the next edition's group stage which was their first time leaving the group stage since 2010. Ramón Díaz was sacked on 21 February 2018 and he was replaced Juan Brown as caretaker until the end of the season, he managed to salvage the season by winning Al-Hilal their 15th domestic league title.

Return to continental dominance (2019–present) 
The 2018–19 season saw drastic changes to the league with an increase in the number of clubs from 14 to 16, as well as the increase of foreign players to 8. This season saw the arrival of Bafetimbi Gomis, Andre Carrillo and Sebastian Giovinco managed by Jorge Jesus. The season started very well winning first nine matches of the league, when a new president was appointed Jesus was sacked on 30 January with no specified reason even though he had won 20 matches, was leading the league by 9 points and had won the 2018 super cup. Things started to go downhill from there, by the end of the season Al-Hilal ended up as runner-up in the league by one point to Al-Nasser and runner-up in the 2018–19 Arab Club Champions Cup, lost out to Al-Taawon in the semi-final of the king cup. Mohammed bin Faisal resigned as president on the 1st of may before the season ended.

Fahad bin Nafil was elected president for a four-year term. Răzvan Lucescu was appointed as the new manager, several players that were deemed unneeded were released. South Korean defender Jang Hyun-soo was signed alongside Colombian international Gustavo Cuéllar. The season started well and Al-Hilal was leading the table almost the whole season with Al-Nassr being the only other club in the title race with Al-Hilal finishing the season as champions and setting a new points record of 72, Al-Hilal beat Al-Nasser 4–1 to end their title hopes. During the 2019 Champions League campaign Al-Hilal produced one of the most dominating and exciting performances in the competition history to reach the final midway through the season. The first Champions league match of the season was against Al-Ahli in the round of 16 Al-Hilal won 4–1 away With Gomis scoring a hattrick, and lost 0–1 at home, Al-Hilal qualified to the next stage with an aggregate score of 4–2. The quarter final matched Al-Hilal against local rivals Al-Ittihad, the first match ended in a 0-0 stalemate away while the second match Al-Hilal won 3–1 at home with memorable performances from Salem, Carrillo and Giovinco, Al-Hilal qualified to the semi-final with an aggregate score of 3–1. In the semi-final Al-Hilal was against their toughest opponent in the competition Al-Sadd, in the away match Al-Hilal won 4–1 in Doha while the opposing team player Abdulkarim Hassan was sent off. In the return leg at home in Riyadh Al-Sadd was able to turn around the score by scoring four goals to two, and in the last minute of the game they were awarded a free kick at the edge of the box and needed to score one more goal to go through to the final, but Abdullah Al-Mayouf saved the ball and the original time finished with Al-Hilal winning 6–5 on aggregate, Al-Hilal qualified to their third final in 5 years. After trying and failing to win on two previous finals in 2014 and 2017. They played against the Japanese club Urawa Red Diamonds, to whom they lost to in the final two years before. They successfully took a revenge and won 3–0 on aggregate 1–0 at home and 2–0 away, ending a nineteen-year wait for the Asian crown, Bafetimbi Gomis was also the tournaments top scorer and MVP. With both the 2019–20 Saudi Professional League as well as the 2019 AFC Champions league titles secured Al-Hilal had one more title to win to wrap up the treble. Al-Hilal reached the 2019-20 King cup final to face Al-Nasser who hadn't won the cup title since 1990, Al-Hilal won by 2–1 to complete the historic Treble.

Lasty, In the 2021 AFC Champions league Al-Hilal had barley qualified to the knockout stages of the competition. In the round of 16 They faced Esteghlal F.C. and won the match 2–0, in the quarter finals they faced another Iranian team Persepolis F.C. whom they defeated 3–0 to qualify to the next stage. In the semi-final stage Al-Hilal came up against their perennial rivals Al-Nasser which was dubbed as the match of the century due to the long-standing animosity these historic rivals had for each other. This was the first time both teams would face each other in this competition, Further more Al-Nasser had never won the AFC Champions league before and Al-Hilal needed one more title to be the AFC Champions league outright record title holders. The stakes of the game were so high that the tension was felt in the city of Riyadh weeks before the game. The game finished with Al-Hilal winning 2–1 against Al-Nasser to reach the final in addition to bragging rights for many years to come. Al-Hilal reached the final in 2021 to face Pohang Steelers, both clubs had held a record of three Asian champions league titles. Al-Hilal came up on top to score the first goal 16 seconds after the match began. In the end a 2–0 win secured the fourth Asian champions league title, and Al-Hilal became the AFC Champions League unequivocal record title holders.

As the champions of the AFC Champions League, Al-Hilal qualified for the 2021 FIFA Club World Cup in the UAE, Al-Hilal in their first match faced hosts Al Jazira and managed to win 6–1. Al-Hilal later faced UEFA Champions League winners Chelsea but lost 1–0 to face off Egyptian club Al Ahly SC for the match for 3rd place, who are the winners of the 2020-21 CAF Champions League, in which Al-Hilal lost in a 4–0 defeat with a disappointing performance hence Al-Hilal were awarded the 4th position in the tournament.

In September 2022, Al-Hilal offered Cristiano Ronaldo a two-year contract worth €242 million. However, Ronaldo rejected the proposal, calling it "obscene". If accepted, Ronaldo's transfer would have been the most expensive, exceeding Neymar's €222 million transfer. The reports of the offer first surfaced in July 2022, but the Saudi club name was not known. The President of the Saudi Arabian Football Federation, Yasser Al Misehal said he would like to see Ronaldo play in Saudi, but that it "won’t happen before January unfortunately".

In February 2023, Al-Hilal played in the 2022 FIFA Club World Cup and reached the final after victories against Wydad Casablanca and Flamengo.

In the final they lost 5-3 to Real Madrid.As well in February, The Blue Waves made a run to the AFC Champions League quarter final stage where they will face Foolad.

Grounds 
Al-Hilal currently plays their home games at King Fahd International Stadium in Riyadh, stadium that was constructed in 1987 with a capacity of 67,000 supporters. The club's reserve team stadium, Prince Faisal bin Fahd Stadium, was used in 2011–12 when King Fahd Stadium was under renovation. When prince Abdulrahman bin Musa'ad became the President of the club in 2008, there was some serious idea of making Al-Hilal a home avenue but the plans have not come to fruition. Al-Hilal became the tenants of King Saud Stadium from the second part of the 2017–18 season until the end of the 2019–20 season. In February 2022 it was announced that both Al-Hilal and Al-Nassr would become the tenants of the "Qiddiya’s planned cliff-top 40,000+ seat stadium, once complete, will eventually become the new venue for home games for both teams and the full range of sporting facilities being developed will be made available for both clubs".

Rivalries

Al-Hilal has a long-standing rivalry with Al-Ittihad. From the start of national competition the clubs were seen as representatives of the two biggest cities in Saudi Arabia: Riyadh and Jeddah. While Al-Hilal have won four Asian Club Championship in years 1991, 1999–2000, 2019 and 2021, Al-Ittihad has won AFC Champions League two times in a row, in 2004 and 2005. Al-Hilal won the Saudi El Clasico 62 times, Al-Ittihad won it 50 times, and two sides have drawn 35 times. As of 2019, the biggest win was when Al-Hilal defeated Al-Ittihad 6–0 in 2009–10.

Another rivalry is with their neighbors Al-Nassr, which is called Riyadh's Derby. They have met 148 times, Al-Hilal has won 59 times, lost 48 times, and 41 games have ended in a draw. The biggest win is for Al-Hilal when they defeated Al-Nassr 7–1 in 2006–07. The rivalry with Al-Nasser is more violent between them than the rivalry with Al-Ittihad. As an example, when Al-Hilal reached the 2014 AFC Champions League Final, in 2nd leg Al-Nassr fans awaited Western Sydney Wanderers arrival at the airport to spur them on against Al-Hilal and tried to sabotage Al-Hilal's ticket plan.

Al-Hilal's matches with esteghlal are called the "Classico of Asia  . Source : tarafdari  estnews

Finance and sponsorship

Sponsorship

Mobily was the main sponsor of Al-Hilal, and as part of the sponsorship deal, their logo was displayed on the front of the club's shirts and a plethora of other merchandise. The Mobily deal was announced by the club's previous President Abdulrahman bin Musa'ad on 14 October 2008, and is worth a Saudi record SAR 517 million, to be paid over six years (SAR 69.1 million per year).

Also, the previous president Prince Abdulrahman bin Musa'ad made a contract with Omar Almady, CEO of Volkswagen Group in Saudi Arabia. the contract period is 6 years and was signed on 18 September 2014.

Television match broadcasting rights

Al-Hilal receives a certain amount from the Saudi Arabia Football Federation as the federation sell the complete matches' right in one package and all the clubs in the Saudi Professional League share the revenue equally. The Saudi league broadcasting rights currently were sold to Saudi Broadcasting Authority's SBC Channel, as well as Shahid streaming service.

Other income sources

The club's president and other board members secure any extra income required to run the club from merchandising of the club's kit and other products as well as establishing an investment company owned by the club to increase the club's revenue. Recently Sponsorships have been instrumental to the clubs finances due to the numerous lucrative deals signed by the club, owing to the fact that the clubs huge popularity and appeal locally, regionally and continentally generates a huge number of supporters and admirers especially on social media; Where the club has an over 15m+ followers across all social media accounts.

Charity and philanthropy

Special seats have been allocated for the disabled to watch the training. Twenty-five percent of the income of tickets sold goes to charities. Players and board members arrange and attend social activities for charities during Eid and other holidays.

Club facilities

In 2009, the club opened a new camp in Riyadh. It contains 25 rooms, meeting rooms, smart room for lectures, library, eating room, living rooms, a big salon and a medical clinic. It also has entertainment corners for video games, table tennis, billiards, table football and many others. There are two training fields for the senior team.

Players

Out on loan

Personnel

Coaching staff

Management

This is a list of Al-Hilal SFC presidents and chairmen from their foundation in 1957.

Honours
The club holds 65 official titles.

Domestic

Confederation

Worldwide

Regional

Others

Recent seasons
The table below chronicles the achievements of Al-Hilal in various competitions since 1999.

Key

 Pld = Games played
 W = Games won
 D = Games drawn
 L = Games lost
 GF = Goals for
 GA = Goals against
 Pts = Points
 Pos = Final position

 W = Champion
 RU = Final (Runner-up)
 SF = Semi-finals
 QF = Quarter-finals
 R16/R32 = Round of 16, round of 32, etc.
 GS = Group stage
 QS = Qualifying stage

Records

Asian record

Overview

Record by country

Matches

Key: PO – Play-off round; 1R/2R – First/Second round; R16 – Round of 16; QF – Quarter-final; SF – Semi-final;

Notes

Top scorers in Asian competitions

See also
Sultan Al-Saud

References

External links
 Official website 
 AlHilal deal with Mobily

 
Association football clubs established in 1957
Hilal
Hilal
Hilal
Hilal
H
H
H